Guy Isbel Tutwiler (July 17, 1889 – August 15, 1930), nicknamed "King Tut", was an American baseball player. Between 1910 and 1924, he appeared in more than 1,500 games as professional baseball player, including more than 600 games as an outfielder and more than 125 games as a first baseman. He played in Major League Baseball for 27 of those games with the Detroit Tigers in 1911 and 1913. The bulk of his career was in the minor leagues, including five seasons with the Providence Grays.

Early years
Tutwiler was born in Coalburg, Alabama, in 1889.

Professional baseball
Tutwiler appeared in 27 major league games, including 14 as a first baseman, six as a second baseman, and three as an outfielder. In his major league career, Tutwiler had a batting average of .203 with 16 hits, seven runs scored, 10 runs batted in, six walks, 12 doubles, two stolen bases, and one triple. He also played 13 seasons in the minor leagues, including stints with the Hattiesburg Timberjacks (1910–1911), Chattanooga Lookouts (1912), Providence Grays (1912, 1914–1917), Mobile Bears (1919–1920), Little Rock Travelers (1921), Memphis Chickasaws (1922) and Augusta Tygers (1924). His batting average in the minor leagues was .291. His most productive year as a baseball player was 1913 when he compiled a .345 batting average, .552 slugging percentage and 57 extra base hits in 115 games with the Fort Wayne Champs.

Family and later years
Tutwiler was married to Edna Mae Scruggs, and they had two sons, Guy Tutwiler Jr. and Pickens McQueen Tutwiler. He died in 1930 at age 42 in a train accident in Birmingham, Alabama. He was buried at Elmwood Cemetery in Birmingham.

References

1880s births
1930 deaths
Detroit Tigers players
Baseball players from Alabama
Major League Baseball first basemen
Hattiesburg Timberjacks players
Chattanooga Lookouts players
Providence Grays (minor league) players
Fort Wayne Champs players
Mobile Bears players
Memphis Chickasaws players
Augusta Tigers players
Railway accident deaths in the United States
Accidental deaths in Alabama